Amorcito Corazón (English title: Darling Sweetheart) is a Mexican telenovela produced by Lucero Suárez for Televisa, and aired from August 29, 2011 to June 10, 2012. It is a remake of the Venezuelan telenovela Trapos íntimos, produced in 2002.

It stars Fabiola Campomanes, Elizabeth Álvarez, Diego Olivera as the main protagonists, while Grettell Valdéz, África Zavala, Daniel Arenas, Alejandro Ibarra and Ricardo Fastlicht star as the co-protagonists. With Liz Vega and Miguel Ángel Biaggio as the main antagonist, and stellar performances of Mariana Karr, Silvia Mariscal and Macaria.

In the United States, Univision aired Amorcito Corazón from May 30, 2012 to February 1, 2013.

Plot 
Isabel Cordero (Elizabeth Álvarez) is an unlucky in love architect who lost the love of her life, Rubén (Alejandro Nones), when she was 18 years old because of her controlling father, Leopoldo (Alfonso Iturralde) who left his wife to start a relationship with Isabel's godmother. For this reason, Isabel's mother, Sara (Silvia Mariscal) loses her mind for a while and is admitted to a psychiatric medical institution. Isabel believes that she is cursed.  She thinks that every man who falls in love with her will suffer for it.  She thinks she will never succeed in love and be happy, until she meets Fernando Lobo (Diego Olivera).

Fernando Lobo is the manager of a construction company, who after the death of his wife Sofía (Fabiola Campomanes), is committed to raising their three daughters. While on a working trip to Veracruz, he meets Doris (Liz Vega) with whom he starts a short lived romance. After the project, he returns to the capital. Under somewhat funny circumstances, he meets Isabel, who is also his neighbor. Unknown to Fernando, Isabel is a friend of his three daughters. Doris, meanwhile, will join forces with Alfonso (Miguel Ángel Biaggio), Isabel ex-boyfriend, to prevent the relationship between Isabel and Fernando.

Lucía (Africa Zavala), Fernando's younger sister, is about to finish her novitiate in the convent run by Sor Ernestina (Raquel Morell), when she meets Willy (Daniel Arenas), a gym instructor that, in turn, is a gigolo. Despite her convictions about her religious vocation, the emergence of Willy and his declaration of love, will make Lucía hesitate. In addition, Beba (Mariana Karr) is in love and obsessed with Willy, but all he wants is her money. Hortensia (Macaria), Beba's best friend and mother in law of Fernando, wants to open the eyes of her friend.

Zoe (Grettell Valdéz), Isabel and Lucía's best friend, is a young woman dedicated to her home and her husband Álvaro (Pietro Vannucci), who is cheating on her with a man in his own house. After this discovery, Zoe realizes that she never really fell in love with Álvaro or any other man and does not "get them". In a suicide attempt, she meets Cecilio (Ricardo Fastlicht). She begins to like Cecilo but later will meet Felipe (Alejandro Ibarra) who will become her boyfriend and her husband and father of her daughter . She is unaware that Cecilio and Felipe are friends and business partners.

Marisol (Renata Notni), the eldest daughter of Fernando, is a rebellious teenager who is in constant conflict with her father, but finds love with Juancho (Diego Amozurrutia), a humble young man who is also a cousin of Willy. However, Barbara (Gaby Mellado), sister of Willy, is also in love with him and will do everything possible to separate them.

A twist in the story happens when Manuela (Fabiola Campomanes), Sofía's twin sister, returns, and is obsessed with Fernando, her late sister's husband.

Cast 

 Elizabeth Álvarez - Isabel Cordero Valencia de Lobo
 Diego Olivera - Fernando Lobo Carvajal
 Fabiola Campomanes - Manuela Ballesteros Tres Palacios / Sofía Ballesteros Tres Palacios de Lobo
 Mariana Karr - Beatificación "Beba" Vda. de Solís
 Silvia Mariscal - Sara Valencia de Cordero
 Macaria - Hortensia Tres Palacios Vda. de Ballesteros
 Alejandro Ibarra - Lic. Felipe Ferrer
 Grettell Valdéz - Zoe Guerrero de García de Ferrer 
 África Zavala - Lucía Lobo Carvajal de Pinzón
 Gerardo Murguia - Jorge Solís
 Ricardo Fastlicht - Lic. Cecilio Monsalve
 Miguel Ángel Biaggio -  Alfonso "Poncho" Armendáriz
 Liz Vega - Doris Montiel de Armendáriz
 Diego Amozurrutia - Juan Francisco "Juancho" Hernández
 Renata Notni - María Soledad "Marisol" Lobo Ballesteros
 Gaby Mellado - Bárbara Pinzón Hernández de Rossy
 Ricardo Margaleff - Ramón "Moncho"
 Eduardo Shacklett - Ricardo "Ricky" Pinzón Hernández
 Adanely Núñez - Adela
 Gloria Sierra - Ana
 Rosita Pelayo - Guillermina Alcaráz
 Alfonso Iturralde - Leopoldo Cordero Méndez
 Daniel Arenas - William "Willy Boy" Guillermo Pinzón Hernández
 Patricia Martínez - Eulalia "Lala" Hernández Vda. de Pinzón
 María Alicia Delgado - Susana Susy
 Rubén Cerda - Padre Benito Carvajal
 Pietro Vannucci - Álvaro García de Alba
 Bibelot Mansur - Yazmín
 Raquel Morell - Sor Ernestina
 Queta Lavat - Sor Pilar
 Thelma Dorantes - Irma
 Maite Valverde - Mayela
 Joana Brito - Minerva
 Polo Monarrez - "Chicho"
 Regina Tiscareño - María Fernanda "Marifer" Lobo Ballesteros
 Karol Sevilla - María Lucia "Marilú" Lobo Ballesteros
 Omar Isfel - Gabriel "Tuqueque"

Special participation
 Carmen Becerra - Sabrina Peñaralta 
 Alejandro Nones - Rubén
 Christian de la Campa - Martín Corona

Awards and nominations

References

External links 

Mexican telenovelas
Televisa telenovelas
2011 telenovelas
2011 Mexican television series debuts
2012 Mexican television series endings
Mexican television series based on Venezuelan television series
Spanish-language telenovelas